Polyangium is a genus of flatworms belonging to the family Microscaphidiidae.

The species of this genus are found in Australia.

Species:
 Polyangium linguatula (Looss, 1899) 
 Polyangium manueli Eduardo & Diaz, 2008

References

Platyhelminthes